Lasse Karjalainen (born 22 October 1974) is a Finnish former footballer. He was born in Sweden but spent most of his childhood at Pori, Finland.

Karjalainen played 14 seasons in the Finnish premier division Veikkausliiga for FC Jazz and FC Haka. He capped 15 times for the Finland national team. Karjalainen is the player with most Finnish Championship titles.

Honors 
Finnish Championship: 1993, 1995, 1998, 1999, 2000, 2004
Finnish Cup: 1997, 2002, 2005
Finnish League Cup: 1995

References 

1974 births
People from Botkyrka Municipality
Finnish footballers
Finland international footballers
Veikkausliiga players
FC Jazz players
FC Haka players
Porin Palloilijat players
Living people
Association football defenders